This list of Norwegian fjords shows many of the fjords in Norway.  In total, there are about 1,190 fjords in Norway and the Svalbard islands.  The sortable list includes the lengths and locations of those fjords.

Fjords

See also

 List of glaciers in Norway
 Geography of Norway

 
Fjords
Norway
Fjords